Phil Ofosu-Ayeh (born 15 September 1991) is a professional footballer who plays as a right-back for Halmstads BK. Born in Germany, Ofosu-Ayeh has made one appearance for the Ghana national team.

Club career
On 29 April 2014, Ofosu-Ayeh signed a two-year contract to join VfR Aalen the following season. After Aalen's relegation, he transferred to Eintracht Braunschweig for the 2015–16 2. Bundesliga season. Ofosu-Ayeh's contract with Braunschweig was not renewed after the 2016–17 2. Bundesliga season.

On 20 June 2017, he signed a three-year deal with Sky Bet Championship side Wolverhampton Wanderers.

On 31 August 2018, Ofosu-Ayeh joined Hansa Rostock on loan until the end of 2018–19 season. On 31 January 2019, the last day of the 2018–19 winter transfer window, the dissolution of his loan contract was agreed. In his half-season at the club he made five appearances.

On 31 January 2019, Ofosu-Ayeh joined Würzburger Kickers on loan for the rest of the 2018–19 season.

He was released by Wolves on 1 July 2020 without playing a single game for them. After his departure, Ofosu-Ayeh recovered from his injuries and trained with various Swiss club such as Bülach, Red Star Zürich and Young Fellows Juventus.

After recovering from his injuries he went on trial with Swedish club Halmstads BK and was eventually able to secure a contract with the club, making his debut against Västerås SK in the Svenska Cupen. However things was cut short as shortly into the premiere match of Allsvenskan 2021, he got injured and was forced to get substituted, it was later confirmed that he had injured his cruciate ligament and was expected miss most of the season.

International career
Ofosu-Ayeh, born in Moers to a German mother and a Ghanaian father, was given a call-up to the preliminary Ghana U-20 squad for the 2011 African Youth Championship, but his club at the time, SV Wilhelmshaven, refused to give him permission to play at the tournament.

On 13 October 2015, Ofosu-Ayeh made his full international debut for Ghana, in a friendly against Canada played in Washington, D.C.

Career statistics

References

External links
 
 
 
 

1991 births
Living people
People from Moers
Sportspeople from Düsseldorf (region)
German sportspeople of Ghanaian descent
Citizens of Ghana through descent
Ghanaian footballers
German footballers
Footballers from North Rhine-Westphalia
Association football defenders
Ghana international footballers
3. Liga players
2. Bundesliga players
SV Wilhelmshaven players
FC Rot-Weiß Erfurt players
MSV Duisburg players
VfR Aalen players
Eintracht Braunschweig players
Wolverhampton Wanderers F.C. players
FC Hansa Rostock players
Würzburger Kickers players
Halmstads BK players
Allsvenskan players
Ghanaian expatriate footballers
Ghanaian expatriate sportspeople in Sweden
Expatriate footballers in Sweden